The Venerable  Glyndwr Rhys Renowden  CB, BA was an eminent Anglican priest in the second half of the 20th century.

He was born into an ecclesiastical family on 13 August 1929, educated at Llanelli Grammar School and St David’s College, Lampeter and ordained in 1953. After curacies at St Mary’s, Tenby and St Mary’s, Chepstow he entered the RAF Chaplaincy Service, in which he served for 30 years eventually becoming an Honorary Chaplain to the Queen (1980) and the service's Chaplain-in-Chief (1983).  He retired from military service in 1988 and became Priest in charge at Llanfallteg with Clunderwen and Castell Dwyran.

He died on 17 August 2002.

Notes and references

1929 births
2002 deaths
People educated at Llanelli Boys' Grammar School
Alumni of the University of Wales, Lampeter
Companions of the Order of the Bath
Honorary Chaplains to the Queen
Royal Air Force Chaplains-in-Chief